Herronton is a hamlet in southern Alberta, Canada within Vulcan County. The post office was opened in 1912 and named after John Herron of the North-West Mounted Police.

Demographics 
The population of Herronton according to the 2007 municipal census conducted by Vulcan County is 10.

See also 
List of communities in Alberta
List of hamlets in Alberta

References 

Hamlets in Alberta
Vulcan County